Gülşat Aygen PhD, MA, BA is a linguist, educator, author, editor, and translator born in Turkey. Dr. Aygen's research agenda includes both theoretical and applied linguistics, encompassing morphosyntax, language education, and many Turkic languages, particularly Turkish, her native language. She is currently a distinguished teaching professor of linguistics at Northern Illinois University.

Dr. Aygen's wider intellectual interests have led her to translate dozens of articles, a book, and edit many translated books from English to Turkish, transcribe and edit old Ottoman manuscripts. The 8th edition of her translation of Elias Canetti’s Crowds and Power was published in 1998.

She has been interviewed on many topics in linguistics including the language of social media, the significance and benefits of heritage languages such as Kurdish, lexical properties of certain words in the political discourse, and language acquisition.

Research Agenda 
In theoretical linguistics, Dr. Aygen has worked extensively on the nature of finiteness, case, and agreement regarding clausal architecture in the world's languages, as well as the structure of reduced relative clauses and embedded clauses, specificity, scrambling, the copula.

In applied linguistics and language education, she cultivated a descriptive linguistics approach to English grammar designed to not only assist language learners of all levels to develop and refine their English language use, but also to help those language users understand the deeper structures behind the language without resorting to simple memorization. 

In her book English Grammar: a descriptive linguistics approach, she focused on the contradiction between descriptive and prescriptive grammar by developing a new framework with which prescriptive grammar can be re-analyzed using the linguistic tools of descriptive linguistics. This approach has been adopted to teach English grammar to native speakers or non-native speakers of English. The same approach has been adopted to teaching different aspects of English, such as writing. In Word Choice Errors: A descriptive linguistics approach, this descriptive linguistics approach is applied by enabling language learners to understand their choice of words at a true descriptive linguistics level.

In languages other than English, Dr. Aygen also worked and published on teaching Turkish as a second language, English as a second language, and gave talks on teaching Kurdish as a second language. She has also authored reference grammars of Kurmanji Kurdish and Kirmancki/Zazaki Kurdish.

In sociolinguistics, she has worked on the languages of the Grand Bazaar and in media studies on syntax of the TV series Frasier.

She has also co-authored work on morphosyntax of agrammatic aphasia, neurology, and history of neuroscience.

Education 
Dr. Aygen received her Ph.D. in linguistics from Harvard University, after completing her graduate studies at Harvard and MIT (1998–2002). Her formal advisors were primarily Jim C-T Huang of Harvard and Shigeru Miyagawa of MIT, Noam Chomsky was her informal advisor

American Academy for Girls, Istanbul, Turkey (1970–1977)

Cerrahpasa Medical School, Istanbul, Turkey (1977–1981)

Bogazici University, Istanbul, Turkey (BA,1996/MA, 1998)

Harvard University (PhD, 2002)

References

Further reading 
 Gulsat Aygen: The fellow learner
 Resmî dili kaldırsak mı 
 İşkenceciler afişe ediliyor
 The Courage of Strangers: Coming of Age With the Human Rights Movement
 Kaktüsler Susuz da Yaşar
 Kitle ve İktidar: Elias Canetti (çev. Gülşat Aygen)
 Kitle ve İktidar – Elias Canetti. 30 yıl düşünmede ısrar ederek yazılmış, insanı anlamanın kaynağı

External links 
 
 
 (TR) Guest of an episode of Nilay Örnek's nasıl olunur podcast

Linguists from Turkey
Turkish translators
Northern Illinois University faculty
Harvard Graduate School of Arts and Sciences alumni
Living people
Year of birth missing (living people)